Tripoli Zoo is a zoological garden and botanical garden in Tripoli, Libya. Located south of Tripoli's city center adjacent to Tarabulus Zoo Park, it is a large reserve of plants, trees and open green spaces and is the country's biggest zoo.

Libyan civil war 
The zoo was forced to shut for safety reasons due to the Libyan Civil War, with many animals becoming more and more traumatised and distressed. After the overthrow of Muammar Gaddafi, the BBC published a short news film detailing the problems the zoo now faced, from a lack of money to feed the animals, to a fragile security system. The animals, the BBC said, were recovering slowly and returning to normal.

References 

Buildings and structures in Tripoli, Libya
Zoos in Libya
Articles needing infobox zoo